Megamelus palaetus is a species of delphacid planthopper in the family Delphacidae. It is found in North America.

References

Further reading

 
 

Delphacini
Articles created by Qbugbot
Insects described in 1897